The Suzuki Karimun is a nameplate of city cars produced by the Japanese automaker Suzuki and marketed in Indonesia between September 1999 and 2021 by Suzuki Indomobil Motor, an Indonesian subsidiary of Suzuki. It is named after Great Karimun (Karimun Besar), a group of islands in Karimun Regency, Riau Islands, although the subsidiary also said the Karimun name was coined from the phrase "carry to the moon". The Karimun models are based on a kei car platform of Wagon R models and derivatives:
 First generation (SL410R, 1999–2006): a locally built first-generation Wagon R-Wide/+.
 Second generation (MF31S, 2007–2013): a Maruti Zen Estilo imported from India and rebadged as the Karimun Estilo. This model is a restyled first-generation MR Wagon from the Japanese market.
 Third generation (MP31S, 2013–2021): Indonesian version of the second-generation Maruti Wagon R, a longer version of the fourth-generation Japanese market Wagon R. It is assembled locally through Low Cost Green Car (LCGC) program endorsed by the government and sold as the Karimun Wagon R.

References

External links 

 

Karimun
City cars
Hatchbacks
Front-wheel-drive vehicles
Cars introduced in 1999
2000s cars
2010s cars
2020s cars